"How Many Miles to Babylon" is an English-language nursery rhyme. It has a Roud Folk Song Index number of 8148.

Lyrics
The accepted modern lyrics are:

A longer Scottish version has the lyrics:

Various places have replaced Babylon in the rhyme, including London town, Barberry and Berry Bright.

Origins
The rhyme was not recorded until the nineteenth century, but the reference to Cantelon in the Scottish version has led some to conclude that it refers to Caledon in the time of the Crusades. Babylon may be a corruption of 'Babyland', but the city was a common allusion particularly in seventeenth-century England and 'Can I get there by candlelight?' was a common saying in the sixteenth century. It referred to the time of day at which it was necessary to light a candle as the daylight faded. The question here then is to whether or not Babylon can be reached before the light of day faded and the candles must be lit. Naturally this time changed throughout the seasons.
In the 1824 edition of The Scottish Gallovidian Encyclopedia there's a description of the rhyme and the game, giving the distance as "six, seven or a lang eight".

The rhyme was originally accompanied by a singing game in which two lines face each other, with one player in the middle. At the end of the rhyme the players have to cross the space and any caught help the original player in the middle catch the others. The game seems to have fallen out of use in the twentieth century. The game Red Rover, which is first documented in the early twentieth century, has, in its earliest recorded form, the same rules; hypothesizing a connection between the death of the older game and the spread of the new one is therefore natural, though necessarily speculative.

In popular culture

In literature
The opening line is used in Robert Louis Stevenson's poem 'Envoys'. 
It is referenced in Rudyard Kipling's, Rewards and Fairies.
It appears in the novel Sylvie and Bruno by Lewis Carroll.
It is referred to in the novel Forever Amber by Kathleen Winsor. (1944)
 It is sung to Mary, Queen of Scots, by Francis Crawford of Lymond, in the fictional historical novel Queen's Play, the second book of the Lymond Chronicles, by Dorothy Dunnett. 
The rhyme is used in They Came to Baghdad by Agatha Christie.
It prefaces the essay Goodbye to All That by Joan Didion.
It is the title of a family saga by Jennifer Johnston (1974). 
It is the title of a children's book by Paula Fox (1967)  D. White Co., New York 
It appears in the novel Deep Secret by Diana Wynne Jones, where a significantly extended version plays a pivotal role in the plot's resolution. 
It appears in the novel The Other by Tom Tryon. 
It appears in the novel Spinsters in Jeopardy by Ngaio Marsh. 
It appears in Neil Gaiman's novel Stardust and its film adaptation, which each show methods of travel involving a "Babylon Candle." 
It gives the title to Julius Horwitz's novel of London during World War II, Can I Get There by Candlelight? 
It is used as a plot point in C.E. Murphy's Urban Shaman.
It appears in the foreword of the spy novel Twelve Trains to Babylon by Alfred Connable (1971)
It appears in the first story of the short story collection Moon Mirror by Andre Norton.
It is used in "The Story of the Amulet" by E. Nesbit.
It is used as a plot point in An Artificial Night by Seanan McGuire.
It appears in Denise Levertov's poem "Candles in Babylon"
It is referenced in the children's book Can I Get There by Candlelight? (1982) by Jean Slaughter Doty.
It is used in the novel How Many Miles to Babylon? by Jennifer Johnston.
It is used in the short story Babylon 70M (1963) by Donald A. Wollheim, appearing in the first issue of Robert A. W. Lowndes' Magazine of Horror.
 The rhyme appears in the novel Hawksmoor (1985) by Peter Ackroyd. 
 The number of miles in the second line, “three score miles and ten”, matches the years of a human lifespan as stated in the Holy Bible (“The days of our years are threescore years and ten; and if by reason of strength they be fourscore years, yet is their strength labour and sorrow; for it is soon cut off, and we fly away.”). Psalms 90:10 | KJV. 
 
In television and film
It plays a major part in the plot of the 1985 anime film Lupin III: Legend of the Gold of Babylon. The song is repeatedly sung by the character of Rosetta, which helps Lupin figure out how to navigate the traps from within the Tower of Babel and how to find the treasure towards the end of the film. A version of the rhyme is sung in English midway into the film by Naoko Kawai, appearing on the film's original soundtrack as "The Song of Babylon".
It is referenced in the TV series Strange Angel. The rhyme is chanted at the beginning of Season 1, Episode 2 whilst the protagonist is sleeping. 
 
In music
It is parodied as "How many miles to Babyland?" on Lenny and the Squigtones- a comedy album by the characters Lenny and Squiggy from the 1970s sitcom Laverne & Shirley.
It is the title of a song of Yngwie Malmsteen's Fire and Ice album.

Notes

Singing games
English nursery rhymes
Scottish nursery rhymes
English children's songs
Traditional children's songs
Songs about Asia
Songwriter unknown
Year of song unknown